Hlas (meaning "Voice" in Czech and Slovak) may refer to:

 Voice – Social Democracy, a Slovak political party
 Hlas (Czech political party)